This is a list of butterflies of New Caledonia. The total number of Lepidoptera species on New Caledonia is 521 in 304 genera (with 197 endemic species in 17 genera). The total number of butterflies is 72 in 42 genera.

Papilionidae

Papilioninae

Graphium gelon
Papilio amyntor syn. Papilio ilioneus
Papilio anactus 
Papilio montrouzieri

Pieridae

Coliadinae

Catopsilia pomona
Catopsilia pyranthe
Eurema brigitta
Eurema hecabe

Pierinae

Appias albina 
Appias paulina
Belenois java
Cepora perimale
Delias ellipsis
Delias nysa
Elodina pseudanops
Elodina signata
Pieris rapae

Lycaenidae

Polyommatinae

Euchrysops cnejus
Everes lacturnus
Jamides carissima
Lampides boeticus
Leptotes plinius
Nacaduba biocellata
Nacaduba deplorans
Nothodanis schaeffera
Prosotas patricae
Psychonotis purpurea
Theclinesthes petersi 
Udara renevieri
Zizina labradus
Zizula hylax

Theclinae
Deudorix epijarbas

Nymphalidae

Charaxinae
Polyura clitarchus
Polyura gamma

Cyrestinae
Cyrestis whitmei

Danainae

Danaus affinis
Danaus chrysippus
Danaus plexippus
Euploea algea 
Euploea boisduvali
Euploea core
Euploea helcita 
Euploea leucostictos
Euploea lewinii 
Euploea sylvester
Euploea treitschkei
Euploea tulliolus
Parantica pumila
Tirumala hamata

Heliconiinae
Acraea andromacha
Vagrans egista

Libytheinae
Libythea geoffroy

Nymphalinae

Doleschallia bisaltide denisi
Doleschallia tongana
Hypolimnas alimena catalai
Hypolimnas antilope shortlandia
Hypolimnas bolina
Hypolimnas misippus
Hypolimnas octocula 
Junonia villida
Vanessa cardui
Vanessa itea
Vanessa kershawi 
Yoma sabina

Satyrinae
Austroypthima petersi 
Melanitis leda
Paratisiphone lyrnessa

Hesperiidae

Coeliadinae
Badamia atrox 
Badamia exclamationis
Hasora khoda

Hesperiidae
Borbo cinnara
Borbo impar

Sources
endemia.nc
funet
biodiversité et conservatoire en Outre-Mer

References

External links

Butterflies
New Caledonia
Butterflies
New Caledonia
New Caledonia
New Caledonia
New Caledonia
New Caledonia